North Sound is a settlement, former plantation, and former division in Antigua and Barbuda.

In 1725, the Division of North Sound was split into the Division of Old North Sound, and the Division of New North Sound, which became the Parish of Saint George.

History

Plantation Ownership History 

 1700 William Thomas (d.1718)
 1718 Hon. Geo. Thomas (d.1774)
 1736 Dr. Walter Tullideph (1736–1754)
 1777 Sir George Thomas (1748–1815)
 1780 William G. Thomas
 1829 Sir Geo. Thomas, Bart (662 acres – 295 slaves)
 1852 Sir Geo. Thomas, Bart. (602 acres)
 1860 George Estridge
 1870 Ms. Estridge
 1883 Heirs of Shand
 1891 George Estridge 1872
 1921 T DuBuisson & GM & AM Moody-Stuart
 1933 Camacho map
 1943 Antigua Syndicate Estates Ltd. - 400 acres estate
 1968 Government of Antigua and Barbuda – Crown Land

Points of Interest 

 Sir Vivian Richards Stadium

References 

Populated places in Antigua and Barbuda